Fort St. John Airport , North Peace Regional Airport, or North Peace Airport, is located at Fort St. John, British Columbia, Canada. The airport is operated by North Peace Airport Services Ltd (a subsidiary of Vantage Airport Group). A new record of 257,295 passengers came through the airport in 2015, up from the 252,729 passengers seen in 2014.

In 2013, WestJet Encore announced regular scheduled service to Calgary and Vancouver, representing a major expansion of airline service to the Fort St. John market. Scheduled service to Vancouver is also provided by Air Canada Express.

Runways
Fort St. John Airport currently has two runways. Runway 12/30 is a  paved runway, while runway 03/21 is a  paved runway.

Airlines and destinations

History
The aerodrome was listed as "Under Construction - Servicable" with four runways listed as follows:

Historical airline service
Commencing in the early 1940s, Canadian Pacific Air Lines and its successors CP Air and Canadian Airlines International operated scheduled passenger service to Vancouver, British Columbia; Edmonton, Alberta; Prince George, British Columbia; Whitehorse, Yukon; Fort Nelson, British Columbia; Grande Prairie, Alberta and Watson Lake, Yukon.  CP Air served the airport with Boeing 737-200 jetliners during the 1970s with direct, no change of plane flights to all of the above destinations. Other Canadian Pacific flights into the airport over the years were operated with such twin engine prop aircraft as the Lockheed Lodestar, the Douglas DC-3 and the Convair 240 as well as with the larger, four engine Douglas DC-6B propliner and Bristol Britannia turboprop.  In 1994, Canadian Partner code sharing service on behalf of Canadian Airlines International was being operated with de Havilland Canada DHC-8 Dash 8 turboprops and/or Fokker F28 Fellowship jets to the airport from Vancouver, Edmonton, Grande Prairie and Fort Nelson.

See also

Fort St. John (Charlie Lake) Water Aerodrome
Fort St. John/Tompkins Mile 54 Airport

References

External links

Vantage Airport Group

Airfields of the United States Army Air Forces in Canada
Certified airports in British Columbia
Fort St. John, British Columbia
Peace River Regional District
Airfields of the United States Army Air Forces Air Transport Command in Alaska
Royal Canadian Air Force stations
Military airbases in British Columbia
Military history of British Columbia